Belfatto & Pavarini was an American architecture firm based in New York City, practicing in the mid-20th century. Led by Joseph H. Belfatto (1925–2014), the firm was notable for its Modernist style of design, principally of St. Brendan's Church (Bronx, New York) (1966) and Epiphany Church (New York City) (1965).

References

External links
 Joseph Belfatto obituary

Companies based in Manhattan
Defunct architecture firms based in New York City
Architects of Roman Catholic churches
American ecclesiastical architects